Middle Bridge is the crossing of Blue Mesa Reservoir (the Gunnison River) on U.S. Route 50 (US 50) within the Curecanti National Recreation Area in southwest Gunnison County, Colorado, United States, about  east-northeast of the community of Sapinero.

Prior to the construction of the Blue Mesa Dam, US 50 did not cross the Gunnison River there, and a portion of the old highway can be seen descending into the lake.

External links

Bridges of the United States Numbered Highway System
Road bridges in Colorado
Transportation buildings and structures in Gunnison County, Colorado
U.S. Route 50
Steel bridges in the United States
Concrete bridges in the United States
Girder bridges in the United States
Gunnison River
Curecanti National Recreation Area